The 2011 Vanderbilt Commodores football team represented Vanderbilt University during the 2011 NCAA Division I FBS football season.  The Commodores played their seven home games at Vanderbilt Stadium at Dudley Field in Nashville, Tennessee, which has been Vanderbilt football's home stadium since 1922.  The team's head coach was James Franklin, who was in his first year at Vanderbilt.  Hired at Vanderbilt on December 17, 2010, he was previously the offensive coordinator and "head coach in waiting" at the University of Maryland. Vanderbilt has been a member of the Southeastern Conference (SEC) since the league's inception in 1932, and has participated in the conference's Eastern Division since its formation for the 1992 season.  Vanderbilt completed the 2011 regular season with an overall record of 6–6 and a mark of 2–6 in conference play, finishing in a tie with Kentucky for fourth place in the SEC East. They were invited to the Liberty Bowl where they were defeated by Cincinnati 24–31 to finish the season 6–7. 2011. The seniors of the 2011 Vanderbilt football team became the first class in program history to qualify for two bowl games while at the school. Vanderbilt had only been to bowls in 1955 VS Auburn, 1974 VS Texas Tech, 1982 VS Air Force, and 2008 VS Boston College.

Coaching changes

At the end of the 2010 season, head coach Robbie Caldwell resigned from Vanderbilt. After a long nationwide coaching search, in which Gus Malzahn, Auburn's offensive coordinator, nearly accepted the job, James Franklin was hired as the 27th head football coach at Vanderbilt University. Franklin proceeded to hire John Donovan as the new offensive coordinator and Bob Shoop as the new defensive coordinator.  Franklin also retained Herb Hand as offensive line coach from the previous Vanderbilt staff, and hired Chris Beatty from West Virginia, who had been Percy Harvin's high school coach, as the new wide receivers coach.

Recruiting

On February 2, 2011, Franklin announced a football recruiting class of 21 athletes. The class has been hailed as one of the best in Vanderbilt football history, especially because Vanderbilt was able to persuade several prospects from larger and nationally known schools, such as Lafonte Thourogood from Virginia Tech, Dillon Van der Wal from Arizona State, and Barron Dixon from Mississippi State. Lafonte Thourogood and Dillon van der Wal were both rated as four star recruits by Scout.com.

Schedule

Coaching staff

Game summaries

Elon

This game marked the first meeting between these schools.

Connecticut

This was the third meeting between these schools. Vandy holds a one-game lead in the series at 2 wins to 1 loss.

Mississippi

One of college football's oldest rivalries, Vanderbilt and Old Miss have played 85 times since 1894. Vandy won the first 19 of those games, and Ole Miss did not score in the first ten games.  Vandy trails at 37–47–2 Vandy won last game 30–7.

South Carolina

Vandy first played USC in 1961, but they did not play each other again until 1992. They have played each year since, with Vandy losing the first seven games. Vandy trails the overall series 4–16, and USC has won the last two games. The score of the most recent game was 3–21 in favor of South Carolina.

Alabama

Vandy has played Alabama 78 times since 1903. Vandy won the first five games, but have only won ten more times since. Vandy trails the all-time series 15–59–4. Alabama has won the last 20 games (the 1993 games was forfeited). They last played in 2007, with the result a 10–24 Alabama win.

Georgia

Vandy has been playing Georgia almost every year since 1893. Vandy trails 18–51–2 all-time. Georgia has won the last three games, and the last game was 10–34 Georgia.

Army

Army and Vandy have played eight games since 1968. The series is tied at 4 games each. In 2009, Army won their last meeting in overtime, 13–16.

Arkansas

Vandy has played Arkansas eight times since 1949. Vandy trails the series 2–6, and Arkansas has won the last two last games. The last game was an Arkansas win, 14–49. Vanderbilt had a chance to tie the game with :12 left in the 4th quarter, but Carey Spear missed a 27-yard field goal and hooked it right. The Hogs survived their second upset of the season, with Ole Miss being their first.

Florida

Vandy and Florida have been playing since 1945. Vandy trails 9–33–2, and Vandy has lost the last 20 games. In their last meeting, Florida won 14–55.

Kentucky

Vandy and Kentucky have played 83 times since 1896. Vandy won the first nine games, and Kentucky did not score on Vandy for the first eleven games. Vandy trails 38–41–4, and Kentucky has won the last two games. The last game was a 20–38 Kentucky victory.

Tennessee

Vandy and Tennessee have played 105 times. Vandy did not lose for the first 12 games, but since 1928 UT has dominated the series. Overall, Vandy trails 27–72–5. Tennessee has won the last five games in the series, and the last game was a 10–24 Tennessee win.

Wake Forest

Vandy and Wake Forest have played 13 times since 1964, and this is the only series in which Vandy plays during the 2011 football season that Vandy holds the all-time lead in, at 7–6–0. Wake, however, has won the last three. The last game was a 13–34 Wake Forest win.

Cincinnati
Vanderbilt and Cincinnati had met six times, dating back to 1898. Cincinnati holds the lead with 4 wins.

References

Vanderbilt
Vanderbilt Commodores football seasons
Vanderbilt Commodores football